Aukland or Augland is a village in the Torridal valley in the municipality of Kristiansand in Agder county, Norway. The village is located on the western bank of the river Otra between the villages of Strai and Mosby. In 1978, the Torridal Church was built in Aukland. The Norwegian National Road 9 runs north-south through Aukland.

References

Villages in Agder
Geography of Kristiansand